Franz Mark Johansen (born 1928 in Huntsville, Utah and died August 23, 2018) was a Latter-day Saint sculptor and an emeritus professor at Brigham Young University (BYU).  He has been called the founder of the LDS contemporary art movement that expresses spiritual belief through the human form.

Johansen studied at BYU under B. F. Larsen and J. Roman Andrus.  He then pursued advanced studies at the Illinois Institute of Technology, California School of Arts and Crafts,  the Academie de la Grande Chaumiere and the University of Miami.

Johansen joined the BYU faculty in 1956.  He remained a member of the faculty until his retirement in 1987.  For some of this time Johansen was the chairman of the BYU Art Department.

Among works by Johansen are large relief sculptures on the exteriors of the LDS Museum of Church History and Art (now the Church History Museum) on West Temple in Salt Lake City, and the Harold B. Lee Library and Joseph Smith Buildings at BYU.  He also sculpted medallions on the front doors of the Washington D.C. Temple.  Other noted works by Johansen include The Rod and the Veil, 1975, housed in the LDS Church History Museum, Resurrection: Restored 2 Nephi 2:12 and a bust of Gerrit de Jong.  Johansen's The Grave Hath No Victory is located in the BYU sculpture garden between the BYU Museum of Art and the Harris Fine Arts Center.  Johansen also did the sculpture of a family in the Winter Quarters cemetery.  Johansen has also had an oil on canvass painting he did presented in shows.

Johansen received first place at the 20th Annual Spiritual and Religious Art of Utah show at the Springville Art Museum for his work Veiled Study.

Johansen was a member of The Church of Jesus Christ of Latter-day Saints.  He and his wife Ruth Dolores Aldous (1928-2001) had seven children.

Notes

References
University of Utah bio of Johansen
Church News, April 25, 1998.
Utah Artists Project bio of Johansen
Vern Swanson et al., Utah Art, Utah artists: 150 year survey p. 127.
short bio on Johansen
Kerril Sue Rollins, "LDS Artifacts and Art Portray Church History: The New Church Museum", Ensign, April 1984, p. 44
The Washington Temple: A New Landmark
Sunstone article that speaks of Johansen's work
Motley Vision article about Utah Spring Salon with a work by Johansen

1928 births
American Latter Day Saint artists
American sculptors
Alumni of the Académie de la Grande Chaumière
Brigham Young University alumni
Brigham Young University faculty
Illinois Institute of Technology alumni
2018 deaths
People from Huntsville, Utah
University of Miami alumni
American expatriates in France
Latter Day Saints from Utah
Latter Day Saints from Illinois
Latter Day Saints from California
Latter Day Saints from Florida